Sergey Ivanovich Ozhegov (22 September 1900 – 15 December 1964) was a Russian lexicographer who in 1926 graduated from the Leningrad University where his teachers included Lev Shcherba and Viktor Vinogradov.

Biography
In 1935–1940, Ozhegov contributed to Dmitry Ushakov's four-volume explanatory dictionary of the Russian language. His main piece of work, the Dictionary of the Russian Language (""), as updated and corrected by Natalia Shvedova, is the most widely used reference for the Russian language today.

Ozhegov also ran the Russian Language Institute as part of the Russian Academy of Sciences to oversee and advise on the correct spelling, grammar and pronunciation of the Russian language. His work was widely recognized in the Soviet Union and he was accorded burial at the Novodevichy Cemetery.

Ozhegov was not without his detractors, especially among Russian émigrés. Vladimir Nabokov, for instance, compared his dictionary with that of Vladimir Dahl unfavorably and, in his novel Ada or Ardor, even called it "moronic".

Tribute
On September 22, 2020, Google celebrated his 120th birthday with a Google Doodle.

References

External links 
 
 Grave

1900 births
1964 deaths
People from Kuvshinovsky District
People from Novotorzhsky Uyezd
Russian lexicographers
Linguists from Russia
Saint Petersburg State University alumni
Burials at Novodevichy Cemetery
20th-century linguists
20th-century lexicographers